All Saints Church is a historic Anglican church in Shorncote, Gloucestershire, England under the care of The Churches Conservation Trust. It is recorded in the National Heritage List for England as a designated Grade II* listed building.

History
All Saints dates from about 1170.  Alterations were made to it, including the addition of a bellcote, in the 14th century.  The church was restored by William Butterfield in 1883.  The church was declared redundant on 1 July 1984, and was vested in The Churches Conservation Trust on 18 March 1987.

Architecture
The church is in Norman style.  It is constructed in stone rubble, with stone slate roofs.  The plan consists of a nave with a north aisle and a south porch, and a small chancel.  On the east gable of the nave is a double bellcote, over which is a pierced quatrefoil.  In the west, south and east walls are two-light windows.  The south doorway is Norman, with Early English capitals on the outer columns.  On the south side of the chancel is a priest's door between two straight-headed Perpendicular windows.

Inside the church are wagon roofs.  The chancel arch is narrow and pointed and contains 15th-century gates. The arch is decorated with Norman style carving. The font is also Norman.  In the chancel is a piscina and a credence shelf dating from the 14th century, and in the north wall is a 15th-century Easter Sepulchre.  On the chancel walls are medieval wall paintings depicting patterns and foliage.  The pulpit dates from the early 18th century and has a tester suspended above it.  Also in the church are the Royal coat of arms carved in stone.

See also
List of churches preserved by the Churches Conservation Trust in the English Midlands

References

External links
Photographs from rootsweb
Description of church from Parish website

14th-century church buildings in England
Grade II* listed churches in Gloucestershire
Church of England church buildings in Gloucestershire
English churches with Norman architecture
English Gothic architecture in Gloucestershire
Churches preserved by the Churches Conservation Trust